Junun is a 2015 documentary film directed by Paul Thomas Anderson. It documents the making of the album Junun in Mehrangarh Fort in Rajasthan, India, by Israeli composer Shye Ben Tzur, English composer and Radiohead guitarist Jonny Greenwood, Indian ensemble the Rajasthan Express, and Radiohead producer Nigel Godrich.

Junun premièred at the 2015 New York Film Festival and was released on the MUBI film streaming service on October 9, 2015 and on iTunes on November 20, 2015. It received generally favorable reviews.

Production and release 
Junun was filmed at the Mehrangarh Fort in Rajasthan, India. Much of the documentary crew's professional camera equipment was held by customs, forcing them to shoot entirely with carry-on consumer-grade digital cameras and rental equipment from India. Anderson used Godrich's drone to capture aerial footage of the fort. Production was secretive and the film was announced two months before its release.

Junun premiered at the New York Film Festival. It was released on video on demand through the MUBI film streaming service on October 9, 2015 and on iTunes on November 20.

Reception 

On Rotten Tomatoes, Junun has a 100% approval rating based on 14 reviews, with an average rating of 7.9 out of 10. On Metacritic, it has a rating of 78 out of 100 based on 6 reviews.

IndieWire gave Junun a grade of B+ and wrote that it "offers no clear-eyed statement on its subject, but develops an enveloping internal logic about the thrill of artistic innovation." Variety wrote that "Anderson’s aesthetics unobtrusively capture the magic of Greenwood and company’s global partnership. It’s a reverent tribute, and one that articulates its underlying themes in subtle, piercing snapshots." The Hollywood Reporter described it as "a transporting film that places us right there in the room, living and breathing a singular artistic experience. Trying to remain still in your seat is futile."

A.A. Dowd of The A.V. Club gave the film a grade of B and wrote: "Junun may be a minor work from a major director, but it provides plenty of bounce in the step and candy for the ears. It’s hard to ask much more of a music movie." The Guardian gave the film 3 out of 5, writing: "Given how fruitful and fascinating the collaboration has been between Anderson and Greenwood ... this returned favour is a little disappointing. Anderson has brought much less personality and invention to this project than Greenwood gave to [Anderson's] movies."

References

External links
 

2015 films
2015 independent films
2015 documentary films
American independent films
Films shot in Rajasthan
Documentary films about music and musicians
Films directed by Paul Thomas Anderson
2010s American films